Signal peptide peptidase-like 2B, also known as SPPL2B, is a human gene.

This gene is a member of the signal peptide peptidase-like protease (SPPL) family with the conserved active site motifs 'YD' and 'GxGD' in adjacent transmembrane domains (TMDs). This enzyme localizes to endosomes, lysosomes, and the plasma membrane. This protein plays a role in innate and adaptive immunity by cleaving TNFα in activated dendritic cells. Multiple transcript variants encoding different isoforms have been found for this gene.

References

Further reading